Numerical resistivity is a problem in computer simulations of ideal magnetohydrodynamics (MHD).  It is a form of numerical diffusion.  In near-ideal MHD systems, the magnetic field can diffuse only very slowly through the plasma or fluid of the system; it is rate-limited by the inverse of the resistivity of the fluid.  In Eulerian simulations where the field is arbitrarily aligned compared to the simulation grid, the numerical diffusion rate takes the form similar to an additional resistivity, causing non-physical and sometimes bursty magnetic reconnection in the simulation.  Numerical resistivity is a function of resolution, alignment of the magnetic field with the grid, and numerical method.  In general, numerical resistivity will not behave isotropically, and there can be different effective numerical resistivities in different parts of the computational domain.  For current (2005) simulations of the solar corona and inner heliosphere, this numerical effect can be several orders of magnitude larger than the physical resistivity of the plasma.

See also
Numerical diffusion

Numerical differential equations